Sean Reffell (born 4 November 1998) is an English rugby union player who plays as a flanker for United Rugby Championship side Ulster.

Rugby career
Reffell came through the academy of Saracens and made his club debut in the Anglo-Welsh Cup against Sale Sharks in November 2017. In 2017 he also made his debut for the England under-18 side and would go on to make an appearance for England under-20 in a defeat against Scotland during the 2018 Six Nations Under 20s Championship.

Reffell holds the Saracens club record for most tackles in a game with 39 against Worcester Warriors during a Premiership Rugby Cup semi-final in March 2019. He came off the bench in the final of the competition which they lost to Northampton Saints. After Saracens were relegated in 2020 for salary cap breaches, Reffell featured in the RFU Championship play-off victory over Ealing Trailfinders which saw Saracens gain promotion and an immediate return to the top flight. His performances during this campaign saw him win their young player of the season award for 2020–21.

Reffell is an Irish-qualified player and joined Ulster for the 2022–23 season. He made 42 tackles in a single game, on 1 January 2023 against Munster.

References

External links
Ulster Rugby profile
URC profile
Saracens Profile
ESPN Profile
Ultimate Rugby Profile

1998 births
Living people
English rugby union players
Rugby union players from Berkshire
Rugby union flankers
Saracens F.C. players
Ulster Rugby players
English people of Irish descent